Blizzard Entertainment, Inc. is an American video game developer and publisher based in Irvine, California. A subsidiary of Activision Blizzard, the company was founded on February 8, 1991, under the name Silicon & Synapse, Inc. by three graduates of the University of California, Los Angeles: Michael Morhaime, Frank Pearce and Allen Adham. The company originally concentrated on the creation of game ports for other studios' games before beginning development of their own software in 1993 with games like Rock n' Roll Racing and The Lost Vikings. In 1993, the company became Chaos Studios, Inc., and eventually Blizzard Entertainment after being acquired by distributor Davidson & Associates. Shortly thereafter, Blizzard released Warcraft: Orcs & Humans.

Since then, Blizzard Entertainment has created several Warcraft sequels, including highly influential massively multiplayer online role-playing game World of Warcraft in 2004, as well as three other multi-million selling video game franchises: Diablo, StarCraft and Overwatch. Their most recent projects include the expansion for Diablo III, Reaper of Souls; the online collectible card game Hearthstone; the multiplayer online battle arena Heroes of the Storm; the third and final expansion for StarCraft II: Wings of Liberty, Legacy of the Void; the multiplayer first-person hero shooter Overwatch; and the ninth expansion for World of Warcraft, Dragonflight. The games are operated through online gaming service Battle.net.

On July 9, 2008, Activision merged with Vivendi Games, culminating in the inclusion of the Blizzard brand name in the title of the resulting holding company. On July 25, 2013, Activision Blizzard announced the purchase of 429 million shares from majority owner Vivendi. As a result, Activision Blizzard became a completely independent company. Since 2018, the company's reputation has suffered from a series of poorly received games, controversies involving players and staff, and allegations of sexual harassment and other misconduct against leading Blizzard employees.

Blizzard Entertainment hosts annual gaming conventions for fans to meet and to promote their games: the first BlizzCon was held in October 2005, and since then, all of the conventions have been held at the Anaheim Convention Center in Anaheim, California. BlizzCon features game-related announcements, previews of upcoming Blizzard Entertainment games and content, Q&A sessions and panels, costume contests, and playable versions of various Blizzard games. Blizzard WorldWide Invitationals were events similar to BlizzCon held in South Korea and France between 2004 and 2008.

History

Founding (1991–1994) 

Blizzard Entertainment was founded by Michael Morhaime, Allen Adham, and Frank Pearce as Silicon & Synapse in February 1991, after all three had earned their bachelor's degrees from the University of California, Los Angeles, the year prior. The name "Silicon & Synapse" was a high concept from the three founders, with "silicon" representing the building block of a computer, while "synapse" the building block of the brain. The initial logo was created by Stu Rose. To fund the company, each of them contributed about $10,000, Morhaime borrowing the sum interest-free from his grandmother. During the first two years, the company focused on creating game ports for other studios. Ports include titles such as J.R.R. Tolkien's The Lord of the Rings, Vol. I and Battle Chess II: Chinese Chess. In 1993, the company developed games such as Rock n' Roll Racing and The Lost Vikings (published by Interplay Productions).

Around 1993, co-founder Adham told the other executives that he did not like the name "Silicon & Synapse" anymore, as people outside the company were confusing the meaning of silicon the chemical element used in microchips with silicone the materials used in breast implants. By the end of 1993, Adham changed the name to "Chaos Studios", reflecting on the haphazardness of their development processes.

In early 1994, they were acquired by distributor Davidson & Associates for $6.75 million ($ million today). Shortly after this point, they were contacted by a Florida company, Chaos Technologies, who wanted the company to pay  to keep the name. Not wanting to pay that sum, the executives decided to change the studio's name to "Ogre Studios" by April 1994. However, Davidson & Associates did not like this name, and forced the company to change it. According to Morhaime, Adham began running through a dictionary from the start, writing down any word that seemed interesting and passing it to the legal department to see if it had any complications. One of the first words they found to be interesting and cleared the legal check was "blizzard", leading them to change their name to "Blizzard Entertainment" by May 1994.

Shortly thereafter, Blizzard Entertainment shipped their breakthrough hit Warcraft: Orcs & Humans, a real-time strategy (RTS) game in a high-fantasy setting.

Acquisition by Vivendi and World of Warcraft (1995–2007) 
Blizzard Entertainment has changed hands several times since then. Davidson was acquired along with Sierra On-Line by a company called CUC International in 1996. CUC then merged with a hotel, real-estate, and car-rental franchiser called HFS Corporation to form Cendant in 1997. In 1998 it became apparent that CUC had engaged in accounting fraud for years before the merger. Cendant's stock lost 80% of its value over the next six months in the ensuing widely discussed accounting scandal. The company sold its consumer software operations, Sierra On-line (which included Blizzard) to French publisher Havas in 1998, the same year Havas was purchased by Vivendi. Blizzard, at this point numbering about 200 employees, became part of the Vivendi Games group of Vivendi.

In 1996, Blizzard Entertainment acquired Condor Games of San Mateo, California, which had been working on the action role-playing game (ARPG) Diablo for Blizzard at the time. Condor was renamed Blizzard North, with Blizzard's main headquarters in Irvine renamed to Blizzard South to distinguish the two. Diablo was released at the very start of 1997 alongside Battle.net, a matchmaking service for the game. Blizzard North developed the sequel Diablo II (2000), and its expansion pack Lord of Destruction (2001). Following these releases, a number of key staff from Blizzard North departed for other opportunities, such as Bill Roper. Blizzard's management mentioned made the decision August 2005 to consolidate Blizzard North into Blizzard South, relocating staff to the main Blizzard offices in Irvine, and subsequently dropping the "Blizzard South" name.

Following the success of Warcraft II: Tides of Darkness, Blizzard began development on a science-fiction themed RTS StarCraft and released the title in March 1998. The title was the top-selling PC game for the year, and led to further growth of the Battle.net service and the use of the game for esports. Around 2000, Blizzard engaged with Nihilistic Software to work on a version of StarCraft for home consoles for Blizzard. Nihilisitic was co-founded by Robert Huebner, who had worked on StarCraft and other games while a Blizzard employee before leaving to found the studio. The game, StarCraft: Ghost, was a stealth-oriented game compared to the RTS features of StarCraft, and was a major feature of the 2002 Tokyo Game Show. However, over the next few years, the game entered development hell with conflicts between Nihilisitic and Blizzard on its direction. Blizzard ordered Nihilistic to stop work on StarCraft: Ghost in July 2004, and instead brought on Swingin' Ape Studios, a third-party studio that had just successfully released Metal Arms: Glitch in the System in 2003, to reboot the development of Ghost. Blizzard fully acquired Swingin' Ape Studios in May 2005 to continue on Ghost. However, while the game was scheduled to be released in 2005, it was targeted at the consoles of the sixth generation, such as the PlayStation 2 and original Xbox, while the industry was transitioning to the seventh generation. Blizzard decided to cancel Ghost rather than extend its development period to work on the newer consoles.

Blizzard started to work on a sequel to the Warcraft II in early 1998, which was announced as a "role-playing strategy" game. Warcraft III: Reign of Chaos, the third title set in the Warcraft fictional universe, was released in July 2002. Warcraft III has inspired many future games, having the influence on real-time strategy and multiplayer online battle arena genre. Many of the characters, locations and concepts introduced in Warcraft III and its expansion went on to play major roles in numerous future Blizzard's titles.

In 2002, Blizzard was able to reacquire rights for three of its earlier Silicon & Synapse titles, The Lost Vikings, Rock n' Roll Racing and Blackthorne, from Interplay Entertainment and re-release them for the Game Boy Advance handheld console.

In 2004, Blizzard opened European offices in the Paris suburb of Vélizy, Yvelines, France.

Blizzard Entertainment released World of Warcraft, a massively multiplayer online role-playing game (MMORPG) based on the Warcraft franchise, on November 23, 2004, in North America, and on February 11, 2005, in Europe. By December 2004, the game was the fastest-selling PC game in the United States, and by March 2005, had reached 1.5 million subscribers worldwide. Blizzard partnered with Chinese publisher The9 to publish and distribute World of Warcraft in China, as foreign companies could not directly publish into the country themselves. World of Warcraft launched in China in June 2005. By the end of 2007, World of Warcraft was considered a global phenomenon, having reached over 9 million subscribers and exceeded  in revenue since its release. In April 2008, World of Warcraft was estimated to hold 62 percent of the MMORPG subscription market.  Blizzard's staff quadrupled from around 400 employees in 2004 to 1600 by 2006 to provide more resources to the game and its various expansions, and Blizzard moved their headquarters to 16215 Alton Parkway in Irvine, California in 2007 to support the additional staff.

With the success of World of Warcraft, Blizzard Entertainment organized the first BlizzCon fan convention in October 2005 held at the Anaheim Convention Center. The inaugural event drew about 6,000 people and became an annual event which Blizzard uses to announce new games, expansions, and content for its properties.

Vivendi merger with Activision and continued growth (2008–2017) 
Up through 2006, Bobby Kotick, the CEO of Activision, had been working to rebound the company from near-bankruptcy, and had established a number of new studios. However, Activision lacked anything in the MMO market. Kotick saw that World of Warcraft was bringing in over  a year in subscription fees, and began approaching Vivendi's CEO Jean-Bernard Lévy about potential acquisition of their struggling Vivendi Games division, which included Blizzard Entertainment. Lévy was open to a merger, but would only allow it if he controlled the majority of the combined company, knowing the value of World of Warcraft to Kotick. Among those Kotick spoke to for advice included Blizzard's Morhaime, who told Kotick that they had begun establishing lucrative in-roads into the Chinese market. Kotick accepted Lévy's deal, with the deal approved by shareholders in December 2007. By July 2008, the merger was complete, with Vivendi Games effectively dissolved except for Blizzard Entertainment, and the new company was named Activision Blizzard.

Blizzard established a distribution agreement with the Chinese company NetEase in August 2008 to publish Blizzard's games in China. The deal focused on StarCraft II which was gaining popularity as an esport within southeast Asia, as well as for other Blizzard games with the exception of World of Warcraft, still being handled by The9. The two companies established the Shanghai EaseNet Network Technology for managing the games within China. Blizzard and The9 prepared to launch the World of Warcraft expansion Wrath of the Lich King, but the expansion came under scrutiny by China's content regulation board, the General Administration of Press and Publication, which rejected publication of it within China in March 2009, even with preliminary modifications made by The9 to clear it. Rumors of Blizzard's dissatisfaction with The9 from this and other previous complications with World of Warcraft came to a head when, in April 2009, Blizzard announced it was terminating its contract with The9, and transferred operation of World of Warcraft in China to NetEase.

They released an improved version of Battle.net (Battle.net 2.0) in March 2009 which included improved matchmaking, storefront features, and better support for all of Blizzard's existing titles particularly World of Warcraft.

Having peaked at 12 million monthly subscriptions in 2010, World of Warcraft subscriptions sunk to 6.8 million in 2014, the lowest number since the end of 2006, prior to The Burning Crusade expansion. However, World of Warcraft is still the world's most-subscribed MMORPG, and holds the Guinness World Record for the most popular MMORPG by subscribers. In 2008, Blizzard was honored at the 59th Annual Technology & Engineering Emmy Awards for the creation of World of Warcraft. Mike Morhaime accepted the award.

Following the merger, Blizzard found it was relying on its well-established properties, but at the same time, the industry was experiencing a shift towards indie games. Blizzard established a few small teams within the company to work on developing new concepts based on the indie development approach that it could potentially use. One of these teams quickly came onto the idea of a collectible card game based on the Warcraft narrative universe, which ultimately became Hearthstone, released as a free-to-play title in March 2014. Hearthstone reached over 25 million players by the end of 2014, and exceeded 100 million players by 2018.

Another small internal team began work around 2008 on a new intellectual property known as Titan, a more contemporary or near-future MMORPG that would have co-existed alongside World of Warcraft. The project gained more visibility in 2010 as a result of some information leaks. Blizzard continued to speak on Titans development over the next few years, with over 100 people within Blizzard working on the project. However, Titans development was troubled, and, internally, in May 2013, Blizzard cancelled the project (publicly reporting this in 2014), and reassigned most of the staff but left about 40 people, led by Jeff Kaplan, to either come up with a fresh idea within a few weeks or have their team reassigned to Blizzard's other departments. The small team came upon the idea of a team-based multiplayer shooter game, reusing many of the assets from Titan but set in a new near-future narrative. The new project was greenlit by Blizzard and became known as Overwatch, which was released in May 2016. Overwatch became the fourth main intellectual property of Blizzard, following Warcraft, Starcraft, and Diablo.

In addition to Hearthstone and Overwatch, Blizzard Entertainment continued to produce sequels and expansions to its established properties during this period, including StarCraft II: Wings of Liberty (2010) and Diablo III (2012). Their major crossover title, Heroes of the Storm, was released as a MOBA game in 2015. The game featured various characters from Blizzard's franchises as playable heroes, as well as different battlegrounds based on Warcraft, Diablo, StarCraft, and Overwatch universes. In the late 2010s, Blizzard released StarCraft: Remastered (2017) and Warcraft III: Reforged (2020), remastered versions of the original StarCraft and Warcraft III, respectively.

The May 2016 release of Overwatch was highly successful, and was the highest-selling game on PC for 2016. Several traditional esport events had been established within the year of Overwatch release, such as the Overwatch World Cup, but Blizzard continued to expand this and announced the first esports professional league, the Overwatch League at the 2016 BlizzCon event. The company purchased a studio at The Burbank Studios in Burbank, California, that it converted into a dedicated esports venue, the Blizzard Arena, to be used for the Overwatch League and other events. The inaugural season of the Overwatch League launched on January 10, 2018, with 12 global teams playing. By the second season in 2019 it had expanded the League to 20 teams, and with its third season in 2020, it will have these teams traveling across the globe in a transitional home/away-style format.

In 2012, Blizzard Entertainment had 4,700 employees, with offices across 11 cities including Austin, Texas, and countries around the globe. , the company's headquarters in Irvine, California had 2,622 employees.

Change of leadership (2018–present) 
On October 3, 2018, Mike Morhaime announced his plans to step down as the company president and CEO while remaining an advisor to the company; he formally left on April 7, 2019. Morhaime was replaced by J. Allen Brack, the executive producer on World of Warcraft.

Frank Pearce announced he would be stepping down as Blizzard's Chief Development Officer on July 19, 2019, though will remain in an advisory role similar to Morhaime. Michael Chu, lead writer on many of Blizzard's franchises including Diablo, Warcraft, and Overwatch, announced he was leaving the company after 20 years in March 2020.

On January 22, 2021, Activision transferred Vicarious Visions over to Blizzard Entertainment, stating that the Vicarious Visions team had better opportunity for long-term support for Blizzard. Vicarious had been working with Blizzard for about two years prior to this announcement on the planned remaster of Diablo II, Diablo II: Resurrected, and according to Brack, it made sense to incorporate Vicarious into Blizzard for ongoing support of the game and for other Diablo games including Diablo IV. Vicarious was completely merged into Blizzard by April 12, 2022.

In celebration of the company's 30th anniversary, Blizzard Entertainment released a compilation called Blizzard Arcade Collection in February 2021, for various video game platforms. The collection includes their three classic video games: The Lost Vikings, Rock n' Roll Racing, and Blackthorne, each of which containing additional upgrades and numerous modern features.

Activision Blizzard was the subject of a lawsuit from the California Department of Fair Employment and Housing in July 2021, asserting that for several years the management within Blizzard as well as Activision promoted a "frat boy" atmosphere that allowed and encouraged sexual misconduct towards female employees and discrimination in hiring practices. The lawsuit drew a large response from employees and groups outside of Activision Blizzard. In the wake of these events, Brack, one of the few individuals directly named in the suit, announced he was leaving Blizzard to "pursue new opportunities", and will be replaced by co-leads Jen Oneal, the lead of Vicarious Visions and the first woman in a leadership role for the company, and Mike Ybarra, a Blizzard executive vice president. Oneal announced in November 2021 that she would be leaving the company by the end of 2021, leaving Ybarra as the sole leader of Blizzard.

As a result of the California lawsuit and of delays and release issues with their more recent games, Activision Blizzard's stock faced severe pressure. This exchange marks the largest acquisition in tech history, surpassing the $67 billion Dell-EMC merger from 2016. The deal is expected to close by mid-2023, during which Activision Blizzard will remain its own company and, once finalized, will be moved into the Microsoft Gaming division.

Blizzard acquired Proletariat, the developers of Spellbreak, in June 2022 as to help support World of Warcraft. The 100-employee studio remained in Boston but will shutter Spellbreak as they move onto Warcraft.

Ahead of their license renewal in January 2023, Blizzard and NetEase stated in November 2022 that they had been unable to come to an agreement on the renewal terms for their license, and thus most Blizzard games will cease operations in January 2023 until the situation can be resolved.

Games 

Blizzard Entertainment has developed 19 games since 1991, the majority of which are in the Warcraft, Diablo, and StarCraft series. Since the release of Warcraft: Orcs & Humans (1994), Diablo (1997), and StarCraft (1998), the focus has been almost exclusively on those three franchises, with Overwatch (2016) as the sole exception. On October 4, 2022 Overwatch servers were officially shut off, Later Overwatch 2 (2022) servers went up. Additionally, Blizzard has released two spin-offs to the main franchises: Hearthstone (2014), and Heroes of the Storm (2015). The company announced in January 2022 that it was near release of another new intellectual property, a survival game that had been at work at the studio for nearly five years.

Main franchises 
Currently, Blizzard Entertainment has four main franchises: Warcraft, StarCraft, Diablo, and Overwatch. Each franchise is supported by other media based around its intellectual property such as novels, collectible card games, comics and video shorts. Blizzard announced in 2006 that they would be producing a Warcraft live-action movie. The movie was directed by Duncan Jones, financed and produced by Legendary Pictures, Atlas Entertainment, and others, and distributed by Universal Pictures. It was released in June 2016.

Remasters 
In 2015, Blizzard Entertainment formed "Classic Games division", a team focused on updating and remastering some of their older titles, with an initially announced focus on StarCraft: Remastered (2017),  Warcraft III: Reforged (2020), and Diablo II: Resurrected (2021).

Re-released games 
In February 2021, Blizzard Entertainment released a compilation called Blizzard Arcade Collection for Microsoft Windows, Xbox One, PlayStation 4, and Nintendo Switch. The collection includes five Blizzard's classic video games: The Lost Vikings, Rock n' Roll Racing, Blackthorne,  The Lost Vikings 2 and RPM Racing, with the last two games added in April 2021. Some of the modern features include 16:9 resolution, 4-player split-screen, rewinding and saving of game progress, watching replays, and adding graphic filters to change the look of player's game. Additionally, it contains upgrades for each game such as enhanced local multiplayer for The Lost Vikings, new songs and artist performances for Rock n' Roll Racing, as well as a new level map for Blackthorne. A digital museum, which is included in the collection, features game art, unused content, and interviews.

Unreleased games 
Notable unreleased titles include Warcraft Adventures: Lord of the Clans, which was canceled on May 22, 1998, Shattered Nations, and StarCraft: Ghost, which was "Postponed indefinitely" on March 24, 2006, after being in development hell for much of its lifespan. After seven years of development, Blizzard revealed the cancellation of an unannounced MMO codenamed Titan on September 23, 2014. The company also has a history of declining to set release dates, choosing to instead take as much time as needed, generally saying a given product is "done when it's done."

Pax Imperia II was originally announced as a title to be published by Blizzard. Blizzard eventually dropped Pax Imperia II, though, when it decided it might be in conflict with their other space strategy project, which became known as StarCraft. THQ eventually contracted with Heliotrope and released the game in 1997 as Pax Imperia: Eminent Domain.

Ports 
The company, known at the time as the Silicon & Synapse, initially concentrated on porting other studio's games to computer platforms, developing 8 ports between 1992 and 1993.

Company structure 
As with most studios with multiple franchises, Blizzard Entertainment has organized different departments to oversee these franchises. Formally, since around the time of World of Warcraft in 2004, these have been denoted through simply numerical designations. The original three teams were:
 Team 1 manages the StarCraft property. The team also oversaw the development of the StarCraft spin-off Heroes of the Storm. Team 1 also included the Classics Team to work on remastering Blizzard's earlier properties for modern computers, which have included StarCraft: Remastered and Warcraft III: Reforged. The Classic Games team was disbanded around August 2020, about eight months after Warcraft III: Reforged was released; according to Jason Schreier of Bloomberg News, this was due to Activision driving Blizzard away from remastering its old properties, which figured into the launch issues with Warcraft III: Reforged.
 Team 2 continues to manage and create content for World of Warcraft.
 Team 3 oversees the Diablo franchise.

Since 2004, two new teams were created:
 Team 4 was created around 2007 to work on Blizzard's first new IP since World of Warcraft, that being Titan. Titan had development difficulties near 2013, and most of Team 4 was reallocated to the other teams, but the remaining members, led by Jeff Kaplan, revised Titans concept into Overwatch, which remains in Team 4's hands since its release in 2016.
 Team 5 was created in 2008 to explore smaller games that could fit into Blizzard's portfolio. This resulted in the creation of Hearthstone, a collectible card game based on the Warcraft property, which became Team 5's priority.

Technology

Warden client 
Blizzard Entertainment has made use of a special form of software known as the 'Warden Client'. The Warden client is known to be used with Blizzard's online games such as Diablo and World of Warcraft, and the Terms of Service contain a clause consenting to the Warden software's RAM scans while a Blizzard game is running.

The Warden client scans a small portion of the code segment of running processes in order to determine whether any third-party programs are running. The goal of this is to detect and address players who may be attempting to run unsigned code or third party programs in the game. This determination of third party programs is made by hashing the scanned strings and comparing the hashed value to a list of hashes assumed to correspond to banned third party programs. The Warden's reliability in correctly discerning legitimate versus illegitimate actions was called into question when a large-scale incident happened. This incident banned many Linux users after an update to Warden caused it to incorrectly detect Cedega as a cheat program. Blizzard issued a statement claiming they had correctly identified and restored all accounts and credited them with 20 days' play. Warden scans all processes running on a computer, not just the game, and could possibly run across what would be considered private information and other personally identifiable information. It is because of these peripheral scans that Warden has been accused of being spyware and has run afoul of controversy among privacy advocates.

Battle.net 2.0 

Blizzard Entertainment released its revamped Battle.net service in 2009. The platform provides online gaming, digital distribution, digital rights management, and social networking service. Battle.net allows people who have purchased Blizzard products to download digital copies of games they have purchased, without needing any physical media.

On November 11, 2009, Blizzard required all World of Warcraft accounts to switch over to Battle.net accounts. This transition means that all current Blizzard titles can be accessed, downloaded, and played with a singular Battle.net login.

Battle.net 2.0 is the platform for matchmaking service for Blizzard games, which offers players a host of additional features. Players are able to track their friend's achievements, view match history, avatars, etc. Players are able to unlock a wide range of achievements for Blizzard games.

The service provides the user with community features such as friends lists and groups, and allows players to chat simultaneously with players from other Blizzard games using VoIP and instant messaging. For example, players no longer need to create multiple user names or accounts for most Blizzard products. To enable cross-game communication, players need to become either Battletag or Real ID friends.

Controversies and legal disputes

Privacy controversy and Real ID 
On July 6, 2010, Blizzard Entertainment announced that they were changing the way their forums worked to require that users identify themselves with their real name. The reaction from the community was overwhelmingly negative with multiple game magazines calling the change "foolhardy" and an "epic fail". It resulted in a significant user response on the Blizzard forums, including one thread on the issue reaching over 11,000 replies. This included personal details of a Blizzard employee who gave his real name "to show it wasn't a big deal". Shortly after revealing his real name, forum users posted personal information including his phone number, picture, age, and home address.

Some technology media outlets suggested that displaying real names through Real ID is a good idea and would benefit both Battle.net and the Blizzard community. But others were worried that Blizzard was opening their fans up to real-life dangers such as stalking, harassment, and employment issues, since a simple Internet search by someone's employer can reveal their online activities.

Blizzard initially responded to some of the concerns by saying that the changes would not be retroactive to previous posts, that parents could set up the system so that minors cannot post, and that posting to the forums is optional. However, due to the significant negative response, Blizzard President Michael Morhaime issued a statement rescinding the plan to use real names on Blizzard's forums for the time being. The idea behind this plan was to allow players who had a relationship outside of the games to find each other more easily across all the Blizzard game titles.

Hearthstone ban and Hong Kong protests 

During an October 2019 Hearthstone Grandmasters streaming event in Taiwan, one player Ng Wai Chung, going by his online alias "Blitzchung" used an interview period to show support for the protestors in the 2019–20 Hong Kong protests. Shortly afterwards, on October 7, 2019, Blitzchung was disqualified from the current tournament and forfeited his winnings to date, and banned for a one-year period. The two shoutcasters engaged in the interview were also penalized with similar bans. Blizzard justified the ban as from its Grandmasters tournament rules that prevents players from anything that "brings [themselves] into public disrepute, offends a portion or group of the public, or otherwise damages [Blizzard's] image".

Blizzard's response led to several protests from current Hearthstone players, other video game players, and criticism from Blizzard's employees, fearing that Blizzard was giving into the censorship of the Chinese government.  Protests were held, including through the 2019 BlizzCon in early November, to urge Blizzard to reverse their bans. The situation also drew the attention of several U.S. lawmakers, fearing that Blizzard, as a U.S. company, was letting China dictate how it handled speech and also urged the bans to be reversed.

Blizzard CEO J. Allen Brack wrote an open letter on October 11, 2019, apologizing for the way Blizzard handled the situation, and reduced the bans for both Blitzchung and the casters to six months. Brack reiterated that while they support free speech and their decision was in no way tied to the Chinese government, they want players and casters to avoid speaking beyond the tournament and the games in such interviews.

StarCraft privacy lawsuit 
In 1998, Donald P. Driscoll, an Albany, California attorney filed a suit on behalf of Intervention, Inc., a California consumer group, against Blizzard Entertainment for "unlawful business practices" for the action of collecting data from a user's computer without their permission.

FreeCraft 

On June 20, 2003, Blizzard issued a cease and desist letter to the developers of an open-source clone of the Warcraft engine called FreeCraft, claiming trademark infringement. This hobby project had the same gameplay and characters as Warcraft II, but came with different graphics and music.

As well as a similar name, FreeCraft enabled players to use Warcraft II graphics, provided they had the Warcraft II CD. The programmers of the clone shut down their site without challenge. Soon after that the developers regrouped to continue the work by the name of Stratagus.

Founder Electronics infringement lawsuit 
On August 14, 2007, Beijing University Founder Electronics Co., Ltd. sued Blizzard Entertainment Limited for copyright infringement claiming 100 million yuan in damages. The lawsuit alleged the Chinese edition of World of Warcraft reproduced a number of Chinese typefaces made by Founder Electronics without permission.

MDY Industries, LLC v. Blizzard Entertainment, Inc. 

On July 14, 2008, the United States District Court for the District of Arizona ruled on the case MDY Industries, LLC v. Blizzard Entertainment, Inc.. The Court found that MDY was liable for copyright infringement since users of its Glider bot program were breaking the End User License Agreement and Terms of Use for World of Warcraft. MDY Industries appealed the judgment of the district court, and a judgment was delivered by the Ninth Circuit Court of Appeals on December 14, 2010, in which the summary judgment against MDY for contributory copyright infringement was reversed. Nevertheless, they ruled that the bot violated the DMCA and the case was sent back to the district court for review in light of this decision.

MDY v. Blizzards decision did affirm a prior Ninth Circuit ruling in Vernor v. Autodesk, Inc. that software licenses, such as the one used by Blizzard for WoW, were enforceable and enshrined the principle that video games could be sold as licenses to players rather than purchased. This ruling, though limited to the states of the Ninth Circuit, has been used by the industry to continue to sell games as licenses to users.

World of Warcraft private server complications 
On December 5, 2008, Blizzard Entertainment issued a cease and desist letter to many administrators of high population World of Warcraft private servers (essentially slightly altered hosting servers of the actual World of Warcraft game, that players do not have to pay for). Blizzard used the Digital Millennium Copyright Act to influence many private servers to fully shut down and cease to exist.

Blizzard Entertainment, Inc. v. Valve Corporation 
Shortly after Valve filed its trademark for "Dota" to secure the franchising rights for Dota 2, DotA-Allstars, LLC, run by former contributors to the game's predecessor, Defense of the Ancients, filed an opposing trademark in August 2010. DotA All-Stars, LLC was sold to Blizzard Entertainment in 2011. After the opposition was over-ruled in Valve's favor, Blizzard filed an opposition against Valve in November 2011, citing their license agreement with developers, as well as their ownership of DotA-Allstars, LLC. Blizzard conceded their case in May 2012, however, giving Valve undisputed commercial rights to Dota name, while Blizzard would rename their StarCraft II: Heart of the Swarm mod "Blizzard All-Stars", which would eventually become the stand-alone game, Heroes of the Storm.

California Department of Fair Employment and Housing v. Activision Blizzard 
 
Following a two-year investigation, the California Department of Fair Employment and Housing (DFEH) filed a lawsuit against Activision Blizzard in July 2021 for gender-based discrimination and sexual harassment, principally within the Blizzard Entertainment workplace. The DFEH alleges that female employees were subjected to constant sexual harassment, unequal pay, retaliation, as well as discrimination based on pregnancy. The suit also described a "pervasive frat boy workplace culture" at Blizzard that included objectification of women's bodies and jokes about rape. Activision Blizzard's statement described the suit as meritless, contending that action had been taken in any instances of misconduct. The company also objected to the DFEH not approaching them prior to filing. The lawsuit prompted an employee walkout, as well as leading J Allen Brack, and head of human resources, Jesse Meschuk, to step down. Because of these allegations, Blizzard changed names that referenced employees in multiple of its franchises, including Overwatch and World of Warcraft.

Related companies 
Over the years, some former Blizzard Entertainment employees have moved on and established gaming companies of their own. Several of these occurred following the merger between Activision Holdings and Blizzard's parent company at the time,  Vivendi Games in 2008, and more recently as Activision Blizzard has directed Blizzard away from properties like Warcraft and Starcraft properties that are not seen as financial boons to the larger company. These employees left to form their smaller studios to give themselves the creative freedom that they were lacking at Blizzard. Collectively these studios are known as "Blizzard 2.0".  
 Flagship Studios, now defunct, creators of Hellgate: London, also worked on Mythos.
 ArenaNet, creators of the Guild Wars franchise.
 Ready at Dawn Studios, creators of The Order: 1886, Daxter, God of War: Chains of Olympus and an Ōkami port for the Wii.
 Red 5 Studios, now defunct, creators of Firefall, a free to play game MMOG.
 Castaway Entertainment, now defunct, after working on a game similar to the Diablo series, Djinn.
 Carbine Studios, now defunct as of September 2018, after releasing a massively multiplayer title WildStar.
 Hyboreal Games, founded by Michio Okamura.
 Runic Games, now defunct, founded by Travis Baldree, Erich Schaefer, and Max Schaefer; creators of Torchlight.
 Bonfire Studios, founded by Rob Pardo.
 Second Dinner, founded by Ben Brode, creators of  Marvel Snap.
 Dreamhaven, founded by Michael Morhaime.
 Frost Giant Studios, founded by Tim Morten and Tim Campbell, currently developing real-time strategy game Stormgate.
 Uncapped Games, founded by David Kim and Jason Hughes.

References

Further reading

External links 

 

 
Companies based in Irvine, California
Former Vivendi subsidiaries
Video game companies established in 1991
Video game companies of the United States
Video game development companies
Video game publishers
Spike Video Game Award winners